Mila may refer to:

Places 
 Mila, Algeria, a city
 Mila Province, Algeria
 Mila District, Mila Province, Algeria
 Mila, a commune in Mila Province, Algeria
 Mila, Virginia, an unincorporated community
 Mila, a subdistrict of the Pidie Regency in Indonesia

People 
 Mila (given name), including a list of people and characters with the name
 Reginelson Aparecido Paulino Quaresma (born 1977), Brazilian football player known as Milá

Other uses
Mila (research institute), an AI research institute in Montreal
Mila (2001 film), a Filipino drama film
Mila (2021 film), an animated short film
Mila, also known as Apples, a 2020 Greek drama film
Mila, a synonym for the genus of moth Mazuca
Mila (plant), a genus of cactus
Merritt Island Spaceflight Tracking and Data Network station, a NASA radio communications and spacecraft tracking complex
Mercado Integrado Latinoamericano, the integrated stock exchange markets of Chile, Colombia, and Peru
M.I.L.A. (EP)

See also
 Milas (disambiguation)
 Milla (disambiguation)
 Myla (disambiguation)